Halorubraceae is a family of halophilic, chemoorganotrophic or heterotrophic archaea within the order Haloferacales. The type genus of this family is Halorubrum. Its biochemical characteristics are the same as the order Haloferacales.

The name Halorubraceae is derived from the Latin term Halorubrum, referring to the type genus of the family and the suffix "-ceae," an ending used to denote a family. Together, Halorubraceae refers to a family whose nomenclatural type is the genus Halorubrum.

Current taxonomy and molecular signatures 
As of 2021, Halorubraceae contains nine validly published genera. This family can be distinguished from other Halobacteria by the presence of four conserved signature proteins (CSPs).

Phylogeny
The currently accepted taxonomy is based on the List of Prokaryotic names with Standing in Nomenclature (LPSN) and National Center for Biotechnology Information (NCBI).

Note: * Halorubraceae

See also 
 List of Archaea genera

References 

Halobacteria